Jiang Chunyun (April 1930 – 28 August 2021) was a Chinese politician most active in the 1980s and 1990s, who served as Vice-Premier, Vice-Chairman of the Standing Committee of the National People's Congress, and a member of the Politburo of the Chinese Communist Party.

Biography
Jiang was born in Laixi County, Shandong Province, in April 1930, and started work in 1946; he joined the Chinese Communist Party (CCP) in February 1947. Since then, Jiang had served as secretary-general of the Chinese Communist Party Shandong Provincial Committee, secretary of the Central Committee of the Chinese Communist Party Jinan Municipal Committee, governor of Shandong province, secretary of the CCP Shandong Provincial Committee, and vice-premier of the State Council of the People's Republic of China.

When Jiang was elected Vice-Premier of the State Council by the National People's Congress in March 1995, 36 percent of delegates in the Congress either abstained or voted against confirming him. This was the largest protest vote in the Congress up to that time, and may have been due to the feeling of delegates that the NPC was not being allowed the authority it was granted under the Chinese constitution.

He died from an illness in Beijing, aged 91.

He was a member of the Secretariat of the Chinese Communist Party, a member of the 13th, 14th, and 15th Central Committees, and a member of the 14th and 15th Politburos of the Chinese Communist Party.

References

External links
 Biography of Jiang Chunyun , People's Daily Online

1930 births
2021 deaths
Politicians from Qingdao
Governors of Shandong
People's Republic of China politicians from Shandong
Chinese Communist Party politicians from Shandong
Members of the 15th Politburo of the Chinese Communist Party
Members of the 14th Politburo of the Chinese Communist Party
Vice Chairpersons of the National People's Congress